The 2011 FIM Sidecarcross World Championship, the 32nd edition of the competition, started on 3 April and finished after thirteen race weekends on 11 September 2011.

The defending champions were eight time winners Daniël Willemsen from the Netherlands and his passenger Gertie Eggink. In 2011, Willemsen raced with 43-year-old Sven Verbrugge as his passenger, after an injury to first-choice passenger Roman Vasyliaka. Willemsen and Verbrugge were a team for a fifth time in the history of the competition, with the combination winning the 2005 and 2006 titles together. Willemsen temporarily switched to Ondrej Cermak as his passenger for the first of two German GP's because of an injury to Verbrugge. Willemsen and his passenger clinched the World Championship at the second-last race of the season, at Slagelse, Denmark, having a 53-point lead over Latvians Jānis and Lauris Daiders. The Belgian-Latvian combination Joris Hendrickx-Kaspars Liepiņš, the 2009 World Champions and long the main rivals of Willemsen-Verbrugge during the 2011 season, suffered a season-ending injury at the qualifying of the German Grand Prix in July 2011, being able to compete in the race but requiring surgery afterwards.

Parallel to the riders competition, a manufacturers championship was also held. Like in 2010, the competition was a close contest between 2010 champions WSP and eventual winners VMC.

The Sidecarcross World Championship, first held in 1980 and organised by the Fédération Internationale de Motocyclisme, is an annual competition. All races, manufacturers and the vast majority of riders in the competition being in and from Europe. Sidecarcross is similar to motocross except that the teams consist of two riders, a driver and a passenger. Races are held on the same tracks as solo motocross but the handling of the machines differs as sidecars don't lean. The majority of physical work in the sport is carried out by the passenger, who speeds up the sidecarcross in corners by leaning out. The coordination between the driver and the passenger are therefore of highest importance.

Overview
The thirteen races of the season were held in eleven countries, Netherlands, Switzerland, France, Poland, Ukraine, Belgium, Germany, Estonia, Latvia, Russia and Denmark. In comparison to the 2010 edition, the Grand Prix of Great Britain and Italy have been dropped off the calendar while the Swiss GP made a return.

Format

Every Grand Prix weekend is split into two races, both held on the same day. This means, the 2011 season with its thirteen Grand Prix has 26 races. Each race lasts for 30 minutes plus two laps. The two races on a weekend actually get combined to determine an overall winner. In case of a tie, the results of the second race as used to determined the winner. While this overall winners receives no extra WC points, they usually are awarded a special trophy. Race start times are set at 13:30 and 16:00.

Events typically consist of a qualifying competition, held in multiple stages on Saturdays of a race weekend while the two race events are typically held on Sundays. One exception to this rule is Easter weekends, when the races are held on Easter Monday. Race weekends can consist of additional motocross or quart support races as well, but the FIM stipulates that the World Championship races have priority. Riders have to be provided with at least one 30 minute free practice season, which will be timed. A race can consist of up to 30 starters and the qualifying modus is dependent on the number of entries. Up to 32 entries, it will be held in one group split into two sessions of 30 minutes each. Above 32 entries, the starter field will be sub-divided into two groups through ballot and the current standings. Each qualifying group can consist of up to 30 racers. Should there be more than 60 entries, a pre-qualifying has to be held. Of the riders in the two groups, the top-twelve directly qualify for the races. The remaining teams then go to a second-chance qualifying, in which the best six advance. The riders placed seventh and eighth remain in reserve should one of the qualified teams not be able to participate.

The FIM stipulates that all drivers must be of a minimum age of 18 while passengers have to be at least 16 years old to compete, but no older than 50. Riders older than 50 have to provide a certificate of medical fitness to be permitted to compete. The driver has the right to exchange his passenger under certain conditions.

Starting numbers for the season are awarded according to the previous seasons overall finishing position of the driver. Current or former World Champions have however the right to pick any number they wish, except the number one which is reserved for the current World Champion.

The competition is open for motor cycles with two-stroke engines from between 350 and 750cc and four-stroke engines of up to 1,000cc. Each team is permitted the use of two motorcycles with the possibility of changing machines between races.

The FIM does not permit radio communication between riders and their teams. Outside assistance during the race on the course is not permitted unless it is through race marshals in the interest of safety. Limited repairs in the designated repair zone during the race are permitted.

The first twenty teams of each race score competition points. The point system for the season was as follows:

Prize money
In 2011, prize money was awarded to all rider scoring points, with €300 going to each race winner, €250 to the runners-up, gradually declining from there, with  €50 going to all teams placed 12th to 20th. Additionally, every team qualified for the race plus the two reserve teams receive €500 in travel compensation.

Retirements
At the end of the 2011 season a number of long-term competitors retired from the World Championship, the most successful of those being Russian Evgeny Scherbinin, runners-up in 2006 and active since 1999.

Calendar
The calendar for the 2011 season:

 The Sidecarcross des Nations is a non-championship event but part of the calendar and is denoted by a light blue background in the table above.
 Flags for passengers not shown.

Classification

Riders
The top ten teams in the final overall standings were:

 Equipment listed is motor and frame.
 1 Used Ondřej Čermák as his passenger in the first German GP.
 2 Used Elvijs Mucenieks as his passenger for the first two GP's of the season.

Manufacturers
Parallel to the riders championship, a manufacturers competition was also held. In every race, only the best-placed rider of every make was awarded points in this competition.

The final standings in the manufacturers competition were:

2011 season races

Oss – Netherlands
The top ten of the first Grand Prix of the 2011 season, held on 3 April 2011, at Oss in the Netherlands:

Castelnau-de-Lévis – France
The top ten of the first of two French Grand Prix in 2011, held on 17 April at Castelnau-de-Lévis:

Frauenfeld – Switzerland
The top ten of the Swiss Grand Prix in 2011, held on Easter Monday, 25 April at Frauenfeld:

Chernivtsi – Ukraine
The top ten of the Ukrainian Grand Prix in 2011, held on 8 May at Chernivtsi:

Brou – France
The top ten of the second French Grand Prix in 2011, held on 13 June at Brou, Eure-et-Loir:

Gdańsk – Poland
The top ten of the Polish Grand Prix in 2011, held on 26 June at Gdańsk:

Genk – Belgium
The top ten of the Belgian Grand Prix in 2011, held on 3 July at Genk:

Strassbessenbach – Germany
The top ten of the first of two German Grand Prix in 2011, held on 24 July at Strassbessenbach:

Ķegums – Latvia
The top ten of the Latvian Grand Prix in 2011, held on 7 August at Ķegums:

Kiviõli – Estonia
The top ten of the Estonian Grand Prix in 2011, held on 14 August at Kiviõli:

The race at Kiviõli saw the first-ever Sidecarcross Grand Prix win for Vaclav and Marek Rozehnal and the first-ever for the Czech Republic.

Kamensk-Uralsky – Russia
The top ten of the Russian Grand Prix in 2011, held on 21 August at Kamensk-Uralsky:

Slagelse – Denmark
The top ten of the Danish Grand Prix in 2011, held on 4 September at Slagelse:

Rudersberg – Germany
The top ten of the second German Grand Prix in 2011, held on 11 September at Rudersberg:

The last race event of the 2011 season saw the World Champions, Willemsen and Verbrugge, failing to score any points. A dispute during qualifying between the two lead to Verbrugge walking out during the first qualifying session. He later returned to take part in the "last chance", where the team qualified for the race after all. Verbrugge however was injured during a fall and had to be taken to hospital where his arm was placed into a plaster, ruling the team out of the race.

Notes

 Flags for passengers not shown.

References

External links
 The World Championship on Sidecarcross.com
 The John Davey Grand Prix Pages – Results of all GP's up until 2005
 Official FIM website – Sidecar Motocross World Championship

Sidecarcross world championship, 2011
Sidecarcross World Championship seasons